Richard Osborne is a British businessman and mentor who is known primarily for working with the British government authorities to crack down dirty money in the UK's capital city. He is also known as the founder of UKBF.

Career
Richard started his career in 1999 with his first business, Netrotech Limited which was a software company and later dissolved in 2011. In 2002, he founded Quick Formations. It has since become one of the most successful formation agents in the UK. He is also the founder and owner of Business Data Group that supports the start-ups in the UK.

In 2008, he launched a business start-up platform called eFiling. Richard also served as a Director of Northamptonshire Chamber of Commerce.

References

Living people
British financial businesspeople
British public speakers
1974 births